The NBA Conference Finals Most Valuable Player Award (MVP) is an annual National Basketball Association (NBA) award given since the 2022 NBA playoffs to the top performing players in the NBA Conference Finals. The award is decided by a panel of media members, who cast votes after the conclusion of the finals. The person with the highest number of votes wins the award. The Larry Bird Trophy is awarded to the MVP from the Eastern Conference and the Earvin "Magic" Johnson Trophy for the Western Conference. Their namesakes, Basketball Hall of Fame players Larry Bird and Magic Johnson, both entered the NBA in 1979, and their bicoastal rivalry in the 1980s helped revive and popularize the league. The inaugural recipients were Jayson Tatum from the Eastern Conference, and Stephen Curry from the Western Conference.

Winners

Eastern Conference

Western Conference

Teams

See also 

 NBA Most Valuable Player Award
 NBA Finals Most Valuable Player Award
 NBA All-Star Game Kobe Bryant Most Valuable Player Award

References 

Conference Finals Most Valuable Player Award
Conference Finals Most Valuable Player Award
Conference Finals Most Valuable Player Award
Awards established in 2022
Basketball most valuable player awards